Rock Falls Township High School, better known as Rock Falls High School and its initialism RFHS, is a four-year public high school located on the left bank of the Rock River in Rock Falls, Illinois. Three area middle schools feed into it: Rock Falls Middle School, Montmorency School, and East Coloma-Nelson School.

Community
Rock Falls is located 110 miles west of Chicago, 60 miles southwest of Rockford, and 50 miles northeast of the Quad Cities. Rock Falls has a population of approximately 9,000; Sterling, its sister city, has a population of roughly 15,000.

School stats

Student MakeupAccording to the National Center for Education Statistics, as of 2016 approximately 78% of students enrolled at Rock Falls High School were white, 18% Hispanic, and <3% were Asian, Black, or Native American.

ExpensesAccording to Greatschools.org, as of 2007 Rock Falls High School had a budget of $9,846 per student. 75% of the budget went towards staff and administration, and 25% went to student needs and other/miscellaneous use.

Test scoresAt Rock Falls High School, students are given standardized tests in the 11th grade.  In 2021, only 21.6% of students met or exceeded standards on the mathematics section of the SAT, compared to 29.3% of all comparable Illinois students. In the same year, 29.8% of students met or exceeded standards on the English language arts section, slightly lower than the state average of 33%.  On the Illinois Science Assessment in the same year, only 15.7% of students met or exceeded standards, compared to 42.7% statewide.

Activities
Rock Falls' athletic teams are known as the "Rockets" or "Lady Rockets" and the freshman football team is technically the "Meteors" but is still referred to as the "Rockets." From 1942 until 2011, Rock Falls competed in the North Central Illinois Conference.  When that conference - the oldest high school athletic conference in Illinois - dissolved in 2011, Rock Falls joined the Big Northern Conference, where they are a member of the West Division.

In 2008, the Rock Falls High School Contest Play and Group Interpretation teams won the NCIC match, and many of the actors received all conference awards.

Notable alumni
Frank Harts (born 1979), American film, television, and theatre actor 

Jakob Junis (born 1992), baseball pitcher for the San Francisco Giants

References

External links
Rock Falls High School Website
Rock Falls (Illinois High School Association)

Public high schools in Illinois
Schools in Whiteside County, Illinois